Jan Roar Thoresen (born 24 March 1940) is a Norwegian ice hockey player. He played for the club Vålerengens IF and for the Norwegian national ice hockey team. He  participated at the Winter Olympics in 1964, where he placed tenth with the Norwegian team.

References

1940 births
Living people
Ice hockey people from Oslo
Norwegian ice hockey players
Olympic ice hockey players of Norway
Ice hockey players at the 1964 Winter Olympics